Yuri Aleksandrovich Gulyayev (9 September 1930 – 23 April 1986) was a Soviet opera singer from Tyumen, Ural Oblast, RSFSR.

He studied at the Ural State Conservatory in Sverdlovsk. Amongst his most notable performances were those at the Bolshoi Theatre in Moscow.

He was named a People's Artist of the USSR in 1968. Gulyayev died on 23 April 1986 of heart failure at the age of 55.

References

External links

1930 births
1986 deaths
Soviet male opera singers
People from Tyumen
Baritones
Communist Party of the Soviet Union members
People's Artists of the USSR
Recipients of the Order of Friendship of Peoples
Recipients of the Order of the Red Banner of Labour
Recipients of the USSR State Prize
Soviet male composers
Soviet male singer-songwriters
Burials at Vagankovo Cemetery